Robert Pandini (born June 3, 1961, in Edmonton, Alberta) is a Canadian make-up artist.

He was nominated at the 88th Academy Awards in the category of Best Makeup and Hairstyling for his work on the film The Revenant. His nomination was shared with Siân Grigg and Duncan Jarman.

References

External links
 

Living people
1961 births
Canadian make-up artists
Artists from Edmonton